The 2019–20 Louisville Cardinals men's basketball team represented the University of Louisville during the 2019–20 NCAA Division I men's basketball season. The team played its home games on Denny Crum Court at the KFC Yum! Center in downtown Louisville, Kentucky as members of the Atlantic Coast Conference. They were led by second-year head coach Chris Mack.

The Cardinals finished the season 24–7, and 15–5 in ACC play.  The team was scheduled to play Syracuse in the quarterfinals of the ACC tournament before the tournament was cancelled due to the COVID-19 pandemic.  The NCAA tournament was also cancelled due to the pandemic.

Previous season
The Cardinals finished the 2018–19 season with a record of 20–14, 10–8 in ACC play, finishing in a tie for 6th place. They defeated Notre Dame in the second round of the ACC tournament before losing to North Carolina in the quarterfinals. They received an at-large bid to the NCAA tournament as a No. 7 seed, where they lost in the first round to Minnesota.

Offseason

Departures

Incoming transfers

2019 recruiting class

2020 Recruiting class

Roster

Schedule and results

Source:

|-
!colspan=12 style=| Exhibition

|-
!colspan=12 style=| Regular season

|-
!colspan=12 style=| ACC tournament

Rankings

*AP does not release post-NCAA Tournament rankings

References

Louisville Cardinals men's basketball seasons
Louisville
Louisville Cardinals men's basketball, 2019-20
Louisville Cardinals men's basketball, 2019-20